Piet Beertema (born 22 October 1943 in Amsterdam) is a Dutch Internet pioneer. On November 17, 1988 at 2:28 PM, he linked the Netherlands as the second country (shortly after France's INRIA) to NSFNET, a precursor to the Internet. Beertema was then working as an administrator at the Centrum Wiskunde & Informatica (CWI) in Amsterdam.

His first job was in 1965 at the Dutch National Aerospace Laboratory, where he first came into contact with a computer (an Elliott 803-B). In 1966 he joined the Center for Mathematics and Computer Science, where he worked until his retirement.

On April 1, 1984, Beertema created and posted to the Kremvax Usenet site posing as Konstantin Chernenko. Beertema's message greeted fellow users of Usenet on behalf of the Soviet Union and stated that one aim of them joining was to better present the views of the Soviet regime, alleging that the American administration were seeking war and world domination. The name Kremvax would subsequently be used by Vadim Antonov in 1991, when he became the first Moscovite to join usenet.

On April 25, 1986 Beertema recorded the first country code top level domain .nl. In 1996 he co-founded the  that would take over the management of the .nl domain, after doing this himself for almost 10 years.

On June 9, 1999 he received a royal decoration, Knight of the Order of the Dutch Lion. On September 16, 2004 he officially retired.

See also
Kremvax
Donald Davies, proposed, in 1965, a commercial national data network in the United Kingdom based on packet switching
Peter T. Kirstein, connected University College London to the ARPANET in 1973

References

External link 
  Piet Beertema's Website

1943 births
Living people
Dutch computer scientists
Knights of the Order of the Netherlands Lion
Scientists from Amsterdam